Ambolidibe (also known as Ambolidibe Est or Ambolidibe Atsinanana) is a town and commune in Madagascar. It belongs to the district of Befandriana-Nord, which is a part of Sofia Region. The population of the commune was estimated to be approximately 17,000 in 2001 commune census.

Only primary schooling is available. The majority 99% of the population of the commune are farmers, while an additional 0.5% receives their livelihood from raising livestock. The most important crops are rice and vanilla; also coffee is an important agricultural product. Services provide employment for 0.5% of the population.

References and notes 

Populated places in Sofia Region